The men's 1000 metres races of the 2014–15 ISU Speed Skating World Cup 6, arranged in the Thialf arena in Heerenveen, Netherlands, were held on the weekend of 7–8 February 2015.

Race one was won by Kjeld Nuis of the Netherlands, while Pavel Kulizhnikov of Russia came second, and Nico Ihle of Germany came third. Joey Mantia of the United States won Division B of race one, and was thus, under the rules, automatically promoted to Division A for race two.

Nuis and Kulizhnikov were first and second in race two, while Stefan Groothuis of the Netherlands came third. Haralds Silovs of Latvia won Division B of race two.

Race 1
Race one took place on Saturday, 7 February, with Division B scheduled in the morning session, at 12:51, and Division A scheduled in the afternoon session, at 17:19.

Division A

Division B

Race 2
Race two took place on Sunday, 8 February, with Division B scheduled in the morning session, at 13:11, and Division A scheduled in the afternoon session, at 17:13.

Division A

Division B

References

Men 1000
6